Roanoke–Chowan Community College is a public community college in Ahoskie, North Carolina. It is part of the North Carolina Community College System.

History
In 1967, an abandoned prison compound in Hertford County was purchased. A fund to establish a 2-year vocational and technical training institution was provided by the North Carolina General Assembly. The institution was originally founded as a technical institute. In 1981, Roanoke-Chowan Technical Institute was renamed Roanoke-Chowan Technical College. In 1987, the institution was again renamed, to Roanoke-Chowan Community College.

Campus
The community college issituated on a 41-acre tract of land and has seven buildings which house instructional space and administrative functions. A seven-acre Arboretum/Environmental Science Outdoor Laboratory is also part of the campus. The college has expanded into the vacant Northampton High School-East building to offer General Educational Development and computer literacy programs. In addition, there are several new programs such as a mechatronics engineering technology program.

Academics
The college currently has about 20 curricular programs in which students may seek degrees, diplomas and short term skills-based certificates.

References

North Carolina Community College System colleges
Education in Hertford County, North Carolina
Educational institutions established in 1967
1967 establishments in North Carolina
Two-year colleges in the United States